Dum Dum Girls, also known as Yours Alone, is the second EP by Dum Dum Girls, released via on September 9, 2009 by Captured Tracks. It was only available on 12" vinyl. It included an early version of the title track, which also would later appear on the band's debut album, I Will Be.

Track listing
All songs written and composed by Dee Dee, except as noted.

References

2009 EPs
Dum Dum Girls albums